Sofia's tourist attractions include:

Churches

Other places of worship

Museums and galleries

Education and sciences

Miscellaneous places of culture

Administrative places

Tombs and monuments

Shopping malls

Gardens and parks

Other places of interest

 
Sofia
Sofia
Tourist attractions